Gujak (also Romanized as Gūjak, Goojek, and Gowjak) is a village in Tork-e Gharbi Rural District, Jowkar District, Malayer County, Hamadan Province, Iran. At the 2006 census, its population was 80, in 18 families.

References 

Populated places in Malayer County